Birkenhead General Hospital (known as Birkenhead Borough Hospital until 1926) was a hospital situated on Park Road North, between Prince Edward Street and Livingstone Street, in Birkenhead, England.

History
The hospital was built in 1862 and opened the following year as Borough Hospital. The name was changed to Birkenhead General Hospital in 1926. From 1948 it was run by the Birkenhead Hospital Management Committee, and after 1974 by the Wirral Area Health Authority.  After services were transferred to the newly opened Arrowe Park Hospital, the building ceased to be used in 1982.

References

Sources

Hospital buildings completed in 1864
Buildings and structures in Birkenhead
Hospitals in Cheshire
Defunct hospitals in England
Hospitals disestablished in 1982